Robert Smith (April 11, 1819 – September 19, 1900) was a Canadian politician and farmer.

Born in County Armagh, Ireland, Smith immigrated to British North America with his family in 1828 and settled in the Home District of Canada West, which was to become the County of Peel in Ontario, where he became a farmer. In 1847, he married Eliza Jane McCandless. Smith served on the councils for Chinguacousy Township and Peel County. He was an unsuccessful candidate for a seat in the Legislative Assembly of Ontario in 1867. Smith was narrowly elected to the 2nd Canadian Parliament in the 1872 federal election defeating the Conservative incumbent, John Hillyard Cameron, by 16 votes. He sat as a Liberal representing the riding of Peel and was re-elected in the 1874 election that brought the Liberal Party to power but defeated in the 1878 election that returned a Conservative government. Smith died in Brampton at the age of 81.

References

External links

1819 births
1900 deaths
Liberal Party of Canada MPs
Members of the House of Commons of Canada from Ontario